Whiting House is a historic home located at Glenville, Gilmer County, West Virginia. It was built in 1897, and is a three-story Queen Anne-style residence. It is a brick building and sits on a raised sandstone foundation.  It features a conical tower and a screened in, full-height two story porch facing the Little Kanawha River.

It was listed on the National Register of Historic Places in 1998.

References

Houses on the National Register of Historic Places in West Virginia
Queen Anne architecture in West Virginia
Houses completed in 1897
Houses in Gilmer County, West Virginia
National Register of Historic Places in Gilmer County, West Virginia